Willy Brandt Schule may refer to:

Schools in Germany:
 Willy-Brandt-Schule Kassel
 Willy-Brandt-Schule Lübeck-Schlutup
 Willy-Brandt-Schule Norderstedt

Schools outside of Germany:
 Willy-Brandt-Schule in Warsaw, Poland